is a railway station in Shimizu, Kamikawa District, Hokkaido, Japan.

History
The name was a transliteration from the Ainu language; "san enkoro" translates as "protruding nose" in English. The name was changed to Mikage on 15 October 1922. It was named after the granite which was mined in the area, which is sometimes called  in Japanese. The village of Mikage had been established the previous year.

Lines
Hokkaido Railway Company
Nemuro Main Line Station K26

Adjacent stations

References

Railway stations in Hokkaido Prefecture
Railway stations in Japan opened in 1907